RustDesk is a remote access and remote control software, allowing maintenance of computers and other devices. The RustDesk client is available for different operating systems. RustDesk has the aspiration to be an open source alternative for Remote desktop software like TeamViewer or AnyDesk. Therefore, RustDesk is able to function without additional tools like VPNs or port forwardings, even behind firewalls or NATs. RustDesk used to be based on the proprietary Sciter UI runtime library, but in 2022 plans started to replace it with Flutter.

Features (Extract)
 Remote access for multiple operating systems (Windows, Linux, macOS, iOS, Android)
 End-to-end encryption
 optional self hosted server
 File transfer
 Chat
 TCP Tunneling

See also
 Comparison of remote desktop software
 Remote desktop software

References

External links
 
 source code repository at GitHub
 RustDesk in the Chocolatey repository for Windows
 RustDesk in the F-Droid (Android) app store
 RustDesk in the Google Play (Android) app store
 RustDesk in the Apple App Store (iOS)

Linux remote administration software
MacOS remote administration software
Portable software
Cross-platform software
Remote administration software
Remote desktop
Windows remote administration software